Alan Glen is a Scottish curler.

He played second on Chuck Hay's team out of the Kilgraston & Moncrieffe Curling Club in Perth, Scotland during a very successful run in the 1960s. In the span of six years the team won the Scottish Men's Championship five times, earning them the right to represent Scotland at the World Curling Championships in those years. At World's in 1963, 1966, and 1968 Glen's team took home the silver medal, with Canada winning the Championship each of those years. At the 1967 World Men's Championship they defeated Team Sweden, skipped by Bob Woods, in the final to win Scotland's first World Men's Championship.

In 1983 Glen skipped his team of Murray Melville, Scott Symon, and Leonard Dudman to victory at the Perth Masters.

Glen worked as a farmer in Perthshire.

Teams

References

External links
 

Year of birth missing (living people)
Living people
Scottish male curlers
World curling champions
Scottish curling champions
Scottish farmers
People from Perthshire